The Azores Geopark is a network of 121 geographically-dispersed sites of geographic heritage and marine areas that covers the nine volcanic islands of the archipelago of the Azores. This network is managed by the Azores Geopark Association, a non-profit association, with its headquarters in Horta on the island of Faial, established 19 May 2010. It is part of the European Geoparks Network and the UNESCO Global Geoparks Network. The Association's mission is to ensure the geological conservation, environmental education and sustainable development, while promoting the well-being of the population and a respect for the environment.

Geopark
The term is used to define a well-defined territory and boundary, whose existence is based on an exceptional geological heritage and a strategy that promotes the well-being of the population while maintaining a respect for the environment. Consequently, the Geopark includes a number of significant sites of geological interest, based on their unique or rare characteristics or which have a scientific, cultural, economic (tourist), scenic or aesthetic relevance. Similarly, if its ecology, history or cultural value, along with its thematic or comparable infrastructures can be interconnected in a network, by trails or routes.

Due to its nature, the geopark concept is based on several objectives:
 Conservation and preservation of geosites of particular importance, exploring and developing methods for geo-conservation, in order to protect the geological patrimony for future generations;
 Environmental education to promote public consciousness of the important geological heritage and its contribution to the surrounding environment; and to support scientific research and dissemination, as well as encouraging a dialogue between geoscientists and local communities;
 Stimulate economic activity and sustainable development, through the promotion of nature and rural tourism (Geotourism) for the socio-economic development of the local populations; and to develop an appreciation for the natural and cultural heritage, towards revitalizing traditional activities and products of excellence and quality.

Geography 

There are 121 geosites in the nine islands, most of them with international or national relevance. Among these geosites, 57 were considered priority locations for the application of geoconservation strategies or for appreciation programs.

The archipelago of the Azores includes a rich and vast geodiversity, and an important geological heritage, comprising various locales of interest to the scientific and learning communities, in addition to its socio-economic importance to tourism. Due to it being an archipelago, the Azores Geopark is disperse: guaranteeing a representative geodiversity that characterizes the Azorean territory; manifesting in a history based on geological and active volcanism; with conservation strategies that are common; and based on a decentralized management structure with supports in all islands.

Characteristic of the Azorean geological history is a range of diverse features that includes (but is not limited to) volcanoes, calderas, lakes, lava fields, fumaroles, hot springs and thermal waters, volcanic caves, fajãs, fault scarps and marine fossil deposits. Beyond this heritage, there are other values of reference in the archipelago, such as its rich biodiversity, architecture, culture and ethnography.

Corvo

 COR 1 Caldeirão
 COR 2 Lava fajã of Vila do Corvo
 COR 3 Ponta do Marco

Flores

 FLO 1 Caldeira Negra, Caldeira Comprida, Caldeira Seca and Caldeira Branca
 FLO 2 Caldeira Funda and Caldeira Rasa
 FLO 3 Fajã Grande and Fajãzinha
 FLO 4 Pico da Sé
 FLO 5 Ponta da Rocha Alta and Fajã de Lopo Vaz
 FLO 6 Rocha dos Bordões

Faial

 FAI 1 Caldera
 FAI 2 Pedro Miguel Graben
 FAI 3 Monte da Guia
 FAI 4 Morro do Castelo Branco
 FAI 5 Capelo Peninsula
 FAI 6 Capelinhos e Costado da Nau

Pico

 PIC 1 Fossil arriba of Santo António
 PIC 2 Lava fajã of Lajes do Pico
 PIC 3 Gruta das Torres
 PIC 4 Madalena Islets
 PIC 5 Lajido de Santa Luzia
 PIC 6 Mount Pico
 PIC 7 Achada Plateau
 PIC 8 Ponta da Ilha

São Jorge

 SJO 1 Arribas of Fajã dos Vimes and Fajã de São João
 SJO 2 Central volcanic 
 SJO 3 Fajã do Ouvidor and Fajã da Ribeira da Areia
 SJO 4 Fajãs dos Cubres and Fajã da Caldeira do Santo Cristo
 SJO 5 Morro de Velas and Morro de Lemos

Graciosa

 GRA 1 Caldera and Furna do Enxofre
 GRA 2 Caldera Pêro Botelho
 GRA 3 Ponta da Barca and Baleia Islet
 GRA 4 Porto Afonso
 GRA 5 Ponta do Carapacho, Ponta da Restinga and Baixo Islet

Terceira

 TER 1 Algar do Carvão
 TER 3 Guilherme Moniz Caldera
 TER 2 Santa Bárbara Caldera and Mistérios Negros
 TER 4 Furnas do Enxofre
 TER 5 Monte Brasil
 TER 6 Pico Alto, Biscoito Rachado and Biscoito da Ferraria
 TER 7 Ponta da Serreta and Trachyte lava flows

São Miguel

 SMG 1 Furnas Caldera
 SMG 2 Sete Cidades Caldera
 SMG 3 Fogo Caldera
 SMG 4 Caldeira Velha
 SMG 5 Gruta do Carvão
 SMG 6 Vila Franca Islet
 SMG 7 Lagoas do Congro and Lagoa dos Nenúfares
 SMG 8 Ponta da Ferraria and Pico das Camarinhas
 SMG 9 Serra Devassa
 SMG 10 Vale da Ribeira do Faial da Terra and Fajã do Calhau

Santa Maria

 SMA 1 Barreiro da Faneca
 SMA 2 Pedreira do Campo
 SMA 3 Poço da Pedreira
 SMA 4 Ponta do Castelo
 SMA 5 Ribeira do Maloás

EEZ

 MAR 1 Dom João de Castro Bank
 MAR 2 Mid-Atlantic Ridge and hydrothermal vents

Environmental awareness 
The Geopark implemented various routes and trails on every island to discover the volcanic landscapes. Moreover, many educational activities are organized throughout the year to increase the environmental awareness.

References 
Notes

External links 
 Azores Geopark Official Website
 European Geoparks Network Official Website
 Global Geopark Network Official Website

Parks in the Azores
Geoparks in Portugal